The Eric Morecambe and Ernie Wise Show was a comedy variety show, transmitted on BBC Radio 2 in four series from 1975 until 1978. It starred Eric Morecambe and Ernie Wise. It was written by Eddie Braben and produced by John Browell.
Guest singers appearing on the show included Peters and Lee, Lynsey de Paul and Anita Harris.

References

 The British Comedy Guide - The Eric Morecambe and Ernie Wise Show
 morecambeandwise.com - Episode Guide
 BBC Radio 4 Extra - The Eric Morecambe and Ernie Wise Show

 

BBC Radio comedy programmes
Morecambe and Wise